Mandria ( or Μαντριά) is a village in the Limassol District of Cyprus, located 4 km southwest of Pano Platres.

References

Communities in Limassol District